Grayson Murray (born October 1, 1993) is an American professional golfer.

In his youth career, Murray won three straight Callaway Junior Championships and was the top ranked golfer nationally in his age group. In high school, he won both a team and individual state title while competing for Leesville Road High School.

Murray attended Wake Forest University, East Carolina University, and Arizona State University. He played in the 2013 U.S. Open as an amateur.

Murray earned conditional status on the 2016 Web.com Tour by tying for 74th at Q School. A tie for tenth at the Rex Hospital Open in his native North Carolina, in which he competed on a sponsor exemption, gave him entry into the following tournament, where he tied for eighth and guaranteed himself full playing time for the rest of the season. He had four further top 10s, including a playoff loss at the Digital Ally Open, and finished 18th on the regular-season money list, earning a PGA Tour card for 2017.

On July 23, 2017, he earned his first PGA Tour victory by winning the Barbasol Championship.

Personal life
In October 2022, Murray was severely injured in a scooter crash in Bermuda before the Butterfield Bermuda Championship leading to him withdrawing from the event.

Amateur wins
2006 Callaway Junior World Golf Championship (Boys 11–12)
2007 Callaway Junior World Golf Championship (Boys 13–14)
2008 Callaway Junior World Golf Championship (Boys 13–14)

Professional wins (4)

PGA Tour wins (1)

Web.com Tour wins (1)

Web.com Tour playoff record (0–1)

Other wins (2)
2015 Imperial Headwear Southern Open (eGolf Professional Tour), New Hampshire Open

Results in major championships
Results not in chronological order in 2020.

CUT = missed the half-way cut 
"T" indicates a tie for a place
NT = No tournament due to the COVID-19 pandemic

Results in The Players Championship

CUT = missed the halfway cut
"T" indicates a tie for a place

PGA Tour career summary

* As of the 2020 season.

See also
2016 Web.com Tour Finals graduates
2019 Korn Ferry Tour Finals graduates

References

External links

American male golfers
Wake Forest Demon Deacons men's golfers
Arizona State Sun Devils men's golfers
PGA Tour golfers
Korn Ferry Tour graduates
Golfers from Raleigh, North Carolina
East Carolina Pirates athletes
UNC Greensboro Spartans men's golfers
1993 births
Living people